Alexa Babakhanian (born 16 September 1966) is an Armenian long-distance runner. In 2001, she competed in the women's marathon at the 2001 World Championships in Athletics held in Edmonton, Alberta, Canada. She finished in 47th place.

References

External links 
 

Living people
1966 births
Place of birth missing (living people)
Armenian female long-distance runners
Armenian female marathon runners
World Athletics Championships athletes for Armenia